Gulliver's Travels is a 1977 British-Belgian film based on the 1726 novel of the same name by Jonathan Swift. It mixed live action and animation, and starred Richard Harris in the title role.

Plot 

The opening sequence in live action shows Gulliver announcing his intention to go to sea as a ship's surgeon, followed by scenes of a shipwreck. The remainder of the film has Harris on Lilliput and Blefuscu, with the tiny inhabitants created by animation.

The film ends with a cliffhanger: Having escaped by boat from Lilliput, Gulliver encounters one of the giant inhabitants of Brobdingnag, but there is nothing more about his adventures there or in the other lands mentioned in the novel.

Cast 
 Richard Harris as Gulliver
 Catherine Schell as Mary
 Norman Shelley as Father
 Meredith Edwards as Uncle
Voice cast
 Michael Bates
 Denise Bryer
 Julian Glover
 Stephen Jack
 Bessie Love
 Murray Melvin
 Nancy Nevinson
 David Prowse (uncredited)
 Robert Rietti
 Norman Shelley
 Vladek Sheybal
 Roger Snowden
 Bernard Spear
 Graham Stark

Production 
The film was not consistently funded during its production, which was noted by some reviewers who consider this production to be "low-budget".

Reception 
In comparison to other adaptations of the source material, this film is not well-received. In the words of one reviewer, "the film falls flat."

References

External links 
 
 

1977 films
1970s fantasy adventure films
1970s musical fantasy films
1970s science fiction films
Belgian animated films
British animated films
English-language Belgian films
Films based on Gulliver's Travels
Films directed by Peter R. Hunt
Films scored by Michel Legrand
Films with live action and animation
Films set in the 1690s
1970s English-language films
1970s British films